The 2010 Big 12 Conference women's basketball tournament was the 2010 edition of the Big 12 Conference's championship tournament. It was held at Municipal Auditorium in Kansas City from March 11 through 14, 2010.  Texas A&M, as the tournament champion, received an automatic bid to the 2010 NCAA Women's Division I Basketball Tournament.

Nebraska finished the 2009-10 regular season undefeated, but lost in the semifinals to eventual tournament champion Texas A&M. Nebraska was the one seed in the tournament and received a first round bye, along with the other top four seeds. The tournament ran simultaneously with the 2010 Big 12 men's basketball tournament.

Seeding

Schedule

Tournament
 Times listed are Central Standard Time zone.

All-Tournament team
Most Outstanding Player – Danielle Adams, Texas A&M

See also
2010 Big 12 Conference men's basketball tournament
2010 NCAA Women's Division I Basketball Tournament
2009–10 NCAA Division I women's basketball rankings

References

External links
 Official 2010 Big 12 Women's Basketball Tournament Bracket

Tournament
Big 12 Conference women's basketball tournament
Big 12 Conference women's basketball tournament
Big 12 Conference women's basketball tournament